A555 may refer to the following roads:
 A555 road in Greater Manchester, United Kingdom
 Bundesautobahn 555, between Cologne and Bonn, Germany